Spring is the debut full-length album by Cyann & Ben. It was released on 17 February 2004 on Gooom Disquesin France and Locust Music in North America.

Track listing
"Buick to the Moon"
"I Can't Pretend Anymore"
"Selected Ambient Work"
"Siren Song"
"Behind Her Smiling Eyes"
"Melody"
"Beyond Reality"
"A Dance With the Devil"
"Neurotic Hope"

2004 albums